Jarri (also Romanized as Jarrī and Jarī) is a village in Sigar Rural District, in the Central District of Lamerd County, Fars Province, Iran. At the 2006 census, its population was 442, in 90 families.

References 

Populated places in Lamerd County